The Mornington Peninsula National Park is a national park located in the Greater Melbourne region of Victoria, Australia.

Together with the adjacent Arthurs Seat State Park, the national park was listed on the now-defunct Register of the National Estate, in recognition of their outstanding values and their importance as part
of the protected area's heritage.

Features
The Coast Walk, a two-day  walking track from Cape Schanck to London Bridge takes in almost the entire coastline of the national park. The walk features a network of cliff top tracks with spectacular ocean views and dense coastal vegetation, as well as sections of long beach walks which pass by sculpted sand dunes and tidal rock pools. The Coppins Track is a  return walking track from Sorrento Ocean Beach to Diamond Bay. The Cape Schanck Lighthouse and associated buildings were constructed from 1859 and are excellent example of the architecture of the day.

Situated between Arthurs Seat and Cape Schanck on the Mornington Peninsula, Greens Bush is the largest remnant of bushland on the Peninsula. Surrounded by farmland, the area contains a variety of vegetation communities, making it a wildlife haven and excellent place for nature walking.

Horse riding is a popular activity in parts of the national park, with access from the national park entrance station near Gunnamatta and also near . Dog walking is also permitted in certain parts of beachland within the park, within certain hours; with dogs required to be kept on a leash.

See also

 Protected areas of Victoria
Mornington Peninsula and Western Port Biosphere Reserve

References
https://www.parks.vic.gov.au/places-to-see/parks/mornington-peninsula-national-park

External links

Mornington Peninsula
National parks of Victoria (Australia)
Protected areas established in 1988
1988 establishments in Australia